Road Rage is the thirteenth studio album from the heavy metal band Quiet Riot. This is the first album to feature American Idol alum James Durbin on lead vocals. The album was originally recorded with vocalist Seann Nicols, a former member of Adler's Appetite and Icon, and scheduled for release on April 21, 2017. Pre-orders for the album began on March 1, 2017, and the instant gratification track was titled "The Seeker" (with Nicols).  However, Nicols was fired from the band in March, and it was subsequently announced that the album would be postponed so that Nicols' vocals and lyrics could be replaced and re-recorded by Durbin. The track "The Seeker" was withdrawn from distribution at this point, and never saw release on the final version of Road Rage in any form.  The album finally saw release on August 4, 2017. Billboard Magazine debuted the music video for the single "Can't Get Enough" directed by Regina Russell Banali on July 24, 2017

Track listing

Personnel
Quiet Riot
 James Durbin - vocals
 Alex Grossi - guitars
 Chuck Wright - bass
 Frankie Banali - drums

Charts

References

2017 albums
Quiet Riot albums
Frontiers Records albums